Cooper Heights is an unincorporated community in Walker County, in the U.S. state of Georgia.

History
A post office called Cooper Heights was established in 1891, and remained in operation until it was discontinued in 1951. The community was named for Eliphalet Cooper, a local settler.

References

Unincorporated communities in Walker County, Georgia
Unincorporated communities in Georgia (U.S. state)